Gordi may refer to the following:

Gordi (band), Yugoslav heavy metal band
Gordi (musician), stage name of Australian folktronica singer/songwriter Sophie Payten
Gordi, Iran, village in Iran
Gordi, Georgia, village in Georgia
See also:
Geordie